Nader Hassan Ali Kadhim (born 1973) is a Bahraini writer, academic and cultural critic.

Early life and career

Born in the village of Al Dair in 1973, Kadhim completed his primary, intermediate and secondary education in government schools. He then enrolled in University of Bahrain where he earned a B.A. in Arabic language and literature in 1995 and Master's degree in Modern Criticism in 2001. Between 1995 and 2003 he worked as a part-time lecturer and research assistant in University of Bahrain and then as teacher in government schools. In 2003, he earned his PhD in Arabic literature from the Cairo-based Institute of Arab Research and Studies of the Arab League. He currently works as Professor of Cultural Studies at University of Bahrain. He is also the editor of two literature magazines published by the same university.

Although Kadhim was born to a Shia family, he sees it as no more than a historical coincidence which "does not entail anything". In an interview with Al-Waqt newspaper, he stated that joining college in 1991 was an important turn in his life which until then had been influenced by the Islamic revival in the early 1980s. Kadhim recalled that he took part in several religious activities in his childhood. He refused to be classified as Islamist, Shia Islamist or even Shia intellectual, but considered the Islamic faith and culture that he grew up with as a paving factor to his embracing of postmodernist ideas and distancing him from modernism. Since the early 1990s, Kadhim has shown increasing interest in the critical theory and cultural studies.

In February 2007, Kadhim was honored by Al-Wasat newspaper for his "contributions to the intellectual and cultural" debate in Bahrain. During the event, Mansoor al-Jamri, the editor-in-chief of Al-Wasat praised Kadhim for his anti-sectarian writings and said he was an exceptional writer. Several other academics and journalists praised him as well.

Publications

Kadhim is author to many literature and cultural criticism articles and studies published in Bahraini and Arabic media. Between 2003 and 2013, he has published nine books, two of them earning the "Bahraini outstanding book" award in 2003 and 2004.

References

Academic staff of the University of Bahrain
Bahraini culture
Bahraini Muslims
1973 births
Living people